, also known as , was a Japanese aristocrat (kuge), courtier, and statesman.  He was chancellor (Daijō-daijin) of the Imperial government during the Nara period.

Early life
Nakamaro was the second son of Fujiwara no Muchimaro, who was the founder of southern branch of the Fujiwara clan.

Career
Nakamaro was named to progressively important court positions during the reign of Empress Kōken. 
 Minister of the Right (udaijin)
 Supreme Military Official (shibinaishō)
 Vice Minister (jundaijin)

Opposition led by Tachibana no Naramaro and others was put down in 757.

In 758, Nakamaro was given the title and role of "Grand Guardian" (taihō); and his name was changed to Emi No Oshikatsu.  The power to mint copper coins was granted to Oshikatsu in 758.

Nakamaro became Prime Minister (taishi) during the reign of Emperor Junnin.  He acted to secure the northern border with the Ainu, but his plans did not succeed.

Plans for a military campaign in Korea were started, but it was abandoned.

His plans were opposed by some of his cousins in the Fujiwara clan.

Rebellion

In 764, Nakamaro was a trusted supporter of the emperor Junnin; and he was at odds with former-Empress Kōken and her close associate, the monk Dōkyō.  In the struggle between the factions headed by Junnin and Kōken, Nakamaro was captured and killed.   His wife and children were also killed.  Soon after, Junnin was deposed; and Kōken reclaimed the monarch's role for another five years.

Notes

References
 Bauer, Mikael. The History of the Fujiwara House. Kent, UK: Renaissance Books, 2020; ; 
Brown, Delmer M. and Ichirō Ishida, eds. (1979).  Gukanshō: The Future and the Past. Berkeley: University of California Press. ; OCLC 251325323
Nussbaum, Louis-Frédéric and Käthe Roth. (2005). Japan encyclopedia. Cambridge: Harvard University Press. a; OCLC 58053128
 Plutschow Herbert E. (1983). Historical Nara: with illustrations and guide maps. Tokyo: Japan Times. 
 Sansom, George Bailey. (1958). A History of Japan to 1334. Stanford: Stanford University Press.

See also
 Tōshi Kaden, a bibliographic clan record

Fujiwara clan
706 births
764 deaths
People of Nara-period Japan
People executed by Japan by decapitation